This is a list of sail frigates serving either in the Royal Danish Navy or the Royal Dano-Norwegian Navy in the period 1650–1860:

 Phenix/Føniks 30/32 guns, captured by Sweden 1659 and renamed Danska Fenix
 Hummer 32 guns
 Forgyldte Fisk 28 guns
 Havfru 24 guns
 Flyvende Hjørt 14 guns
 Anthonette 34 guns
 Hvide Falk 28 guns
 Loss 26 guns, burnt 1679
 Jægare 24 guns
 Vindhund 14 guns
 Havmand 34 guns
 Spraglede Falk 16 guns
 Loss 26 guns
 Heyre 24 guns, sunk 1712
 Hvide Ørn 20 guns, captured by Sweden 1715
 Højenhald 30 guns
 Raae 30 guns
 Postillion 26 guns
 Leopard 24 guns
 Søridder 28 guns
 Løvendals Gallej 20 guns
 Kongens Jagt Krone 24 guns
 Svenske Sophia 20 guns
 Stralsund 30 guns
 Najaden 42 guns, destroyed 1812

Frigates, sail
Danish sail